The Mauritian ambassador in Washington, D. C. is the official representative of the Government in Port Louis to the Government of the United States. He is also Permanent Representative next the Headquarters of the United Nations.

List of representatives

References 

 
United States
Mauritius